In basketball, a steal is a "defensive action" that causes the opponent to turn the ball over. The National Basketball Association's (NBA) steal title is awarded to the player with the highest steals per game average in a given season. The steal title was first recognized in the 1973–74 season when statistics on steals were first compiled. To qualify for the steal title, the player must appear in at least 58 games (out of 82). However, a player who appears in fewer than 58 games may qualify as annual steals leader if his steal total would have given him the greatest average, had he appeared in 58 games. This has been the requirement since the 2013–14 season.

Alvin Robertson holds the all-time records for total steals (301) and steals per game (3.67) in a season; achieved in the 1985–86 season. Among active players, Chris Paul had the highest season steal total (217) in the 2007–08 season and the highest season steal average (2.77) in the 2008–09 season.

Paul has won the most steal titles, with six. Micheal Ray Richardson, Robertson, Michael Jordan and Allen Iverson all follow with three. Magic Johnson, Mookie Blaylock, Baron Davis and John Stockton are the only other players to win more than one steal title, with two. Paul has won the most consecutive steal titles, with four. Four players have won both the steal title and the NBA championship in the same season: Rick Barry in 1975 with the Golden State Warriors, Johnson in 1982 with the Los Angeles Lakers, Jordan in 1993 with the Chicago Bulls and Draymond Green in 2017 with Golden State.

Key

Annual leaders

Multiple-time leaders

Notes

References 
General

Specific

National Basketball Association lists
National Basketball Association statistical leaders